Burning Empires is a tabletop science fiction role-playing game, designed by Luke Crane and published by The Burning Wheel in 2006. It is based on Christopher Moeller's two critically acclaimed Iron Empires graphic novels, Faith Conquers and Sheva's War.

Reception
It was awarded Best Licensed RPG of 2006 by Ken Hite, and the Origins Award for Best RPG of 2006.

Contents
The core book is a digest sized, 656 pages, hardcover book in full colour, including almost 400 pieces of artwork.

Burning Empires builds on the Burning Wheel game mechanics, while adding in new rules such as:
 World Burner
 Technology Burner
 Infection mechanics
 Firefight
 Psychology
 Alien Life-Form Burner

The game builds on some of the sci-fi elements and scene structure from an earlier Burning Wheel supplement, Burning Sands: Jihad.  The game fiction assumes a race of sentient wormlike creatures called Vaylen which infect humans and take over their brains.  This infection happens on a massive scale, eventually taking over whole planets in the process.

The phases of a Burning Empires campaign are: infiltration, usurpation, and invasion. And these correspond to the stage of the Vaylen infection on the planet.

Typically, the GM or Game Master will take on the role of the Vaylen invaders, while the players will take the role of mostly humans, who are trying to actively stop this invasion.

Reviews
Pyramid

References

External links 
 

Origins Award winners
Role-playing games based on comics
Role-playing games introduced in 2006
Science fiction role-playing games